Critical Reviews in Biomedical Engineering is a bimonthly peer-reviewed scientific journal published by Begell House covering biomedical engineering, bioengineering, clinical engineering, and related subjects. The editor-in-chief is Chenzhong Li.

External links
 

Biomedical engineering journals
Bimonthly journals
English-language journals
Begell House academic journals